Top Country Albums is a chart that ranks the top-performing country music albums in the United States, published by Billboard.  In 2019, 21 different albums topped the chart, based on multi-metric consumption, blending traditional album sales, track equivalent albums, and streaming equivalent albums.

The number-one position was dominated in 2019 by Luke Combs, who spent 34 weeks in the top spot during the year.  His debut album This One's for You had first reached number one in the summer of 2017, but continued to return intermittently to the top of the chart for more than two years, particularly after the release of a deluxe edition in mid-2018.  In 2019 the album had ten separate spells at number one, totalling 29 weeks atop the chart.  Having already spent 21 weeks at number one in 2017 and 2018, the album reached a total of 50 weeks in the top spot, tying the record set by Shania Twain's album Come On Over for the highest total number of weeks at number one on the Top Country Albums chart.  In June, The Prequel, a five-track EP, spent a single week at number one, and in November his second full-length album What You See Is What You Get reached the top spot, where it had spent four non-consecutive weeks by the end of the year.  It also became the singer's first album to top the all-genres Billboard 200 chart, a feat also achieved by Thomas Rhett's album Center Point Road, which topped both listings in June.

Every other chart-topper of 2019 spent only a single week at number one, and no act other than Combs achieved more than one number one during the year in its own right, although Maren Morris reached number one with her solo album Girl and also as a member of the Highwomen, a supergroup of female country singers.  Several acts reached the top of the chart for the first time in 2019, beginning in the year's first week when former television and film singing cowboy Gene Autry was at number one with Rudolph the Red Nosed Reindeer and Other Christmas Classics, giving him his first chart-topper more than 20 years after his death.  Other acts to reach the top of the chart for the first time during the year were Cody Johnson with Ain't Nothin' to It, Tyler Childers with Country Squire, the Highwomen with their self-titled debut album, Midland with Let It Roll, and the band Whiskey Myers with its eponymous album.  In contrast, Honky Tonk Time Machine was the 27th number one for veteran country star George Strait, a record number of chart-toppers for a single artist.  The year's final number one was Fully Loaded: God's Country, a compilation album by Blake Shelton, which topped the chart in the issue of Billboard dated December 28.

Chart history

References

2019
United States Country Albums